Hugh Gallagher may refer to:

 Hugh Gallagher (advocate) (1933–2004), author and international disability advocate
 Hugh Gallagher (humorist) (aka Von Von Von), author and humorist

See also
 Hughie Gallacher (1903–1957), Scottish footballer
 Hugh Gallacher (footballer, born 1870) (1870–1941), Scottish footballer